Eustathios Konstantinides (Greek: Ευστάθιος Κωνσταντινίδης) (1833 or 1842, Nicosia - 1913) was a Cypriot amateur archaeologist, philologist, school teacher and politician. He studied philology abroad and returned to Cyprus in 1880. In 1883 he became the director of all the schools in Nicosia. From 1893 to 1909 he was a professor of philology at the Pancyprian Gymnasium. From 1909 until 1913 he taught classes on archaeology. Additionally, he was president of "Kypriakos Sillogos" (Association of Cypriots), he came a member of the Council of the Cyprus Museum at its inception in 1882 and he acted as Curator of Antiquities from 1889 to 1912. He conducted excavations at Idalion in 1908 and at a Bronze Age cemetery in Kythrea in 1909. He donated a small collection of Late Bronze Age cylinder seals to the Cyprus Museum. 

After his return to Cyprus in 1880 he was also involved in politics, in 1883 he run for parliament in the district of Nicosia in the first parliamentarian elections that took place in Cyprus and became part of the first Legislative Council that was established by the British. He served until 1891. 

His brother Pascal (Paschalis) Constantinides (1840-1937) was a member of the Committee of Management of the Cyprus Museum and a member of the Legislative Council.

Publications 

 Konstantinides, E. (13th October 1888). Helmets. The Owl. Science, Literature and Art, 4, 29-32.
Konstantinides E. (1889) Ecclesiastical Studies in Cyprus, A New Bishop from Carpasia, The Owl. Science, Literature and Art.
Konstantinides, E. (April 1889). ᾽Ι(ν) τύχαι ἀζαταῖ. The Journal of Cypriote Studies, 23-24.

See also 

 Menelaos Markides

References 

Greek Cypriot people
19th-century births
1913 deaths
Year of birth uncertain

20th-century Cypriot people
19th-century Cypriot people
People from Nicosia